Raichin Antonov (born April 11, 1980) is a Bulgarian former swimmer, who specialized in sprint freestyle events. He is a multiple-time Bulgarian record holder and champion in the 50 and 100 m freestyle. He is also a former member of the swimming team for the Missouri State Bears under head coach Jack Steck, and a business graduate at the Missouri State University in Springfield, Missouri.

Antonov qualified for two swimming events at the 2004 Summer Olympics in Athens, by eclipsing FINA B-standard entry times of 23.48 (50 m freestyle) and 51.65 (100 m freestyle) from the Missouri State Swimming Championships. In the 100 m freestyle, Antonov challenged seven other swimmers on the fourth heat, including two-time Olympians George Gleason of the Virgin Islands and Allen Ong of Malaysia. He rounded out the field to last place and fifty-second overall by 0.29 of a second behind Ong in 52.33. In his second event, 50 m freestyle, Antonov matched his position from his first on the morning's prelims. Swimming in heat five, he touched out Iceland's Örn Arnarson to take a sixth spot by 0.17 of a second, outside his entry time of 23.67.

References

External links
NBC Olympics Profile

1980 births
Living people
Bulgarian male freestyle swimmers
Olympic swimmers of Bulgaria
Swimmers at the 2004 Summer Olympics
Sportspeople from Sofia
Missouri State Bears swimmers
20th-century Bulgarian people
21st-century Bulgarian people